Club Básquet Coruña, more commonly referred by its sponsorship name of Leyma Básquet Coruña, is a professional basketball team based in A Coruña, Galicia. The team currently plays in league LEB Oro.

History

CB Coruña was founded in 1996 as a merger of clubs CB Ventorrillo and CB Arteixo. This club would substitute former Baloncesto Coruña CAB, that played its last season in Liga EBA before being dissolved.

After playing some seasons at Liga EBA, the club joined LEB League, where it remained four years, known as Sondeos del Norte due to sponsorship reasons. In 2002, CB Coruña sold its LEB spot to a new club Basket Zaragoza. After that, the club could continue playing in Liga EBA, thanks to the promotion of its reserve team.

In 2004, Básquet Coruña did not participate in any competition due to financial reasons, but the club comes back in 2005 to Liga EBA. In 2007, the club was invited to the newly created fourth tier LEB Bronce as one of the participants of the Final Stage of the 2006–07 Liga EBA. In their debut season, the club clinched the promotion to LEB Plata where it finished in the relegation positions in their first season. However, the club was repechaged due to the existence of vacant berths.

Básquet Coruña consolidated in LEB Plata until 2012, when it achieved a vacant berth in LEB Oro, coming back to the Spanish second division ten years later.

Players

Current roster

Depth chart

Season by season

Trophies and awards

Trophies
Copa Galicia: (1)
1996

Individual awards
LEB Plata MVP
Robert Joseph – 2009

References

External links
Official website

Basketball teams in Galicia (Spain)
Sport in A Coruña
LEB Oro teams
Former LEB Plata teams
Former Liga EBA teams